Danielle LaPorte (born May 25, 1969) is a bestselling Canadian author, an inspirational speaker, an entrepreneur, and a blogger.

Born in Windsor, Ontario, LaPorte is the author of three non-fiction books with an emphasis on conscious goal-setting and entrepreneurship. Her newest, White Hot Truth looks at the current dynamics of the self-help culture and spiritual devotion. She is also the co-author of a book on personal style.

The Desire Map: A Guide To Creating Goals With Soul has been translated into 8 languages, evolved into a yearly day planner system, a top 10 iTunes app, and an international workshop program with licensed facilitators in 15 countries.

LaPorte's website, DanielleLaPorte.com (formerly WhiteHotTruth.com), discusses spirituality, entrepreneurship, and personal growth. Forbes named her blog one of the top 100 websites for women in 2012, calling LaPorte "a contrarian self-help guru."

LaPorte is one of Oprah Winfrey's Super Soul 100 Leaders. A group in Oprah Winfrey's words, that "is uniquely connecting the world together with a spiritual energy that matters."

Career 
Without a college degree, LaPorte began working at The Body Shop in one of their retail stores. After requesting and receiving several promotions, LaPorte became director of Social Inventions at The Body Shop's Canadian headquarters,

Prior to founding DanielleLaPorte.com, LaPorte was Executive Director of The Arlington Institute think tank in Washington, DC, a partner at Carrie & Danielle, Inc., and was a communications strategist at The Next Level communications agency. She was also a regular contributor on business and career topics on the Canadian Broadcasting Corporation News Network show, Connect with Mark Kelley.

Named one of the "Top 100 Websites for Women" by Forbes, millions of visitors go to DanielleLaPorte.com every month for her daily #Truthbombs and what's been called "the best place online for kickass spirituality."

In 2016 LaPorte founded, VIRTUONICA a multi-media publishing division of Danielle LaPorte, Inc.

LaPorte's virtual company, Danielle LaPorte Inc. is made up of a core team of 11 employees, in 5 countries.

Early life
Danielle was born in Windsor, Ontario, and grew up in the rural parts of Essex County. She is an only child, born shortly after her parents graduated highschool. Her parents are divorced. Danielle considered a career in fashion design. She bartended, waitressed, worked in women's fashion retail, and managed an apartment building. She did not attend college or university. She was the personal assistant and marketing support for a number of self-help authors and then moved into freelance publicity.

She has lived in Toronto, Ontario; Santa Fe, New Mexico; Seattle, Washington; Los Angeles, California; Washington, DC; and Vancouver, BC.

Works

Books 

Style Statement,   Little, Brown and Company, 2008,  (co-authored with Carrie McCarthy)
The Fire Starter Sessions,  Crown Archetype, April 2012, 
The Desire Map, White Hot Press (Danielle LaPorte Inc.), December 2012
The Desire Map, (revised edition) Sounds True, January 2014, 
The Desire Map, (Spanish edition) Sounds True, 
White Hot Truth, Virtuonica, May 2017, 
White Hot Truth eBook, Virtuonica, May 2017, 
How to Be Loving: As Your Heart Is Breaking Open and Our World Is Waking Up, Sounds True, October 2022, 
How to Be Loving: The Journal: Relax Your Mind. Connect with the Divine., Sounds True, November 2022,

Audiobooks 
The Desire Map Experience, Sounds True, January 2014, 
The Desire Map Daily, Sounds True, January 2014, 
The Desire Map Audiobook, Sounds True, January 2014
White Hot Truth Audiobook, Virtuonica, May 2017 
The Fire Starter Sessions Audio Course
How to Be Loving: As Your Heart Is Breaking Open and Our World Is Waking Up, Sounds True, October 2022

Apps 
The Desire Map Graphic Maker. Declare & share your desires.
Conversation Starters: A Desire Map App
The #Truthbomb App

Planners 
The Desire Map Planner From Danielle LaPorte 2018 Daily Edition (Charcoal & Gold), 
The Desire Map Planner From Danielle LaPorte 2018 Daily Edition (Teals & Gold), 
The Desire Map Planner From Danielle LaPorte 2018 Weekly Edition (Charcoal & Gold), 
The Desire Map Planner From Danielle LaPorte 2018 Weekly Edition (Pinks & Gold), 
The Desire Map Planner From Danielle LaPorte 2019 Daily Edition (Charcoal), 
The Desire Map Planner From Danielle LaPorte 2019 Daily Edition (Blue and Red), 
The Desire Map Planner From Danielle LaPorte 2019 Interactive Planner (iPad)
The Desire Map Planner From Danielle LaPorte 2019 Daily Printable
The Desire Map Planner From Danielle LaPorte 2019 Weekly Edition (Charcoal), 
The Desire Map Planner From Danielle LaPorte 2019 Weekly Edition (Purple and Green), 
The Desire Map Planner From Danielle LaPorte 2019 Weekly Interactive (iPad)
The Desire Map Planner From Danielle LaPorte 2019 Weekly Printable
The Desire Map Planner From Danielle LaPorte 2019 Undated Edition (Charcoal), 
The Desire Map Planner From Danielle LaPorte 2019 Undated Edition (Gold and White), 
2020 DAILY Desire Map Planner + Program (Art w/type), 
2020 DAILY Desire Map Planner + Program (Art w/script), 
2020 DAILY Desire Map Planner + Program (Purple w/type), 
2020 DAILY Desire Map Planner + Program (Purple w/script), 
The Desire Map Planner 2020 Interactive Digital (iPad) - Daily Edition
The Desire Map Planner 2020 Printable - Daily Edition
2020 WEEKLY Desire Map Planner + Program (Art w/type), 
2020 WEEKLY Desire Map Planner + Program (Art w/script), 
2020 WEEKLY Desire Map Planner + Program (Purple w/type), 
2020 WEEKLY Desire Map Planner + Program (Purple w/script), 
The Desire Map Planner 2020 Interactive Digital (iPad) - Weekly Edition
The Desire Map Planner 2020 Printable - Weekly Edition
UNDATED WEEKLY Desire Map Planner + Program (Art Teal w/type), 
UNDATED WEEKLY Desire Map Planner + Program (Art Teal w/script), 
UNDATED WEEKLY Desire Map Planner + Program (Art Lavender w/type), 
UNDATED WEEKLY Desire Map Planner + Program (Art Lavender w/script), 
UNDATED WEEKLY Desire Map Planner + Program (Purple w/type), 
UNDATED WEEKLY Desire Map Planner + Program (Purple w/script), 
2021 DAILY Desire Map Planner (Interstellar Orchid), 
2021 DAILY Desire Map Planner (Earth Sky), 
2021 DAILY Desire Map Planner (Steady Indigo), 
2021 Daily Digital Desire Map Planner (Interactive/Ipad)
2021 Daily Printable Desire Map Planner
2021 WEEKLY Desire Map Planner (Interstellar Orchid), 
2021 WEEKLY Desire Map Planner (Earth Sky), 
2021 WEEKLY Desire Map Planner (Steady Indigo), 
2021 Weekly Digital Desire Map Planner (Interactive/Ipad)
2021 Weekly Printable Desire Map Planner

Decks 
Truthbomb Card Deck - Volume 1 (2017 revisions), 
Truthbomb Card Deck - Volume 2 (2017 revisions), 
How to Be Loving: The Deck: For Resilience, Kindness, and All Kinds of Idealism (November 2022),

References

External links 
Interview with Danielle Laporte on The Good Life Project
 

Writers from Windsor, Ontario
Canadian women non-fiction writers
Canadian self-help writers
Canadian motivational speakers
Living people
1969 births